Juggler of Worlds (2008) is a science fiction novel by American writers Larry Niven and Edward M. Lerner, a sequel  to their Fleet of Worlds.

It is set in the Known Space universe. Most of the book revisits earlier stories (the Beowulf Shaeffer stories in Crashlander and Neutron Star from the points of view of Sigmund Ausfaller and several Pierson's Puppeteers; "The Soft Weapon", another story in Neutron Star; and parts of the previous novel in the series, Fleet of Worlds, from the point of view of Nessus).  The novel also severely revises the established knowledge of the Outsider race. The final quarter of the book returns to the setting of and is a sequel to Fleet of Worlds.

References

2008 American novels
Known Space stories
Collaborative novels
Novels by Larry Niven
2008 science fiction novels
American science fiction novels
Tor Books books